Early Voting (foaled March 7, 2019, in Kentucky) is a retired American Thoroughbred racehorse that won the 2022 Preakness Stakes, the second leg of the American Triple Crown. He also won the Withers Stakes and was second in the Wood Memorial.

Background
Early Voting is a dark bay colt who was bred by Three Chimneys Farm in Kentucky. Early Voting was bought by Triphammer Farm on behalf of Klaravich Stables for $200,000 from the Hill 'n' Dale Sales Agency consignment at the 2020 Keeneland September Yearling Sale. He is from the first crop of Gun Runner, the 2017 American Horse of the Year. He is the third of five foals and the lone stakes winner for his dam, Amour d'Ete by Tiznow, who was unraced but is a full-sister to multiple stakes winner Irap. His dam traces to the exceptional broodmare Hildene, a foundation mare for Meadow Stable whose descendants include Hill Prince, First Landing and Cicada.

Early Voting was trained by Chad Brown. Early Voting was ridden by jockey José Ortiz in all his starts, and is owned by Klaravich Stables.

Racing career

2021: Two-year-old season 
Early Voting began his racing career on December 18 in a maiden special weight race over one mile at Aqueduct Racetrack. He faced six other entrants, of which five had previous experience. Nonetheless, Early Voting was highly considered and started as the 19-20 odds-on favorite. He broke well from the outside post and pressed the early pace. He took the lead on the final turn and held under steady urging to win by  lengths in a time of 1:38.41 on a fast track.

2022: Three-year-old season 
Early Voting began his three-year-old campaign in the Grade III Withers Stakes on February 5 at Aqueduct, one of the early events on the 2022 Road to the Kentucky Derby for New York-based horses. Early Voting, the 13-10 favorite, faced ten other three-year-olds on a clear day with a track that was considered muddy. Jockey Jose Ortiz had Early Voting breaking from the gate quickly and established a two-length lead after a half-mile in :48.04. From there, he was able cruise along on the front, increasing the lead to  lengths after six furlongs in 1:14.29. Early Voting sped away to a safe -length lead at the eighth pole and covered the  miles in 1:55.90. Trainer Brown was reserved in commenting after the race. "He's still inexperienced, and might have been looking for company in the stretch. He'll get better with more seasoning."

After a break of eight weeks, Early Voting was entered in the Grade II Wood Memorial, Aqueduct's most important Kentucky Derby prep. Facing seven other entrants, Early Voting was installed as the third favorite at odds of 5-2 behind Morello and Mo Donegal. Early Voting started sharply and led carving out the early fractions of :47.75 and 1:11.59 on a fast track. However, Early Voting was caught on the line and beaten by a neck by the fast finishing Mo Donegal. Trainer Brown said, "He ran a great race. He was second-best today but that was no disgrace."

Early Voting earned 40 qualification points for the Kentucky Derby and after the event was in 16th place for qualification. However, Brown and owner Seth Klarman opted to bypass the Derby because they felt the colt did not have a realistic chance to win the race because of his limited experience. "When you start participating in the Kentucky Derby enough now, you realize what a tough race it is with 20 horses", said Brown. "As the trainer, you have to deal with the aftermath when it doesn't work out. And sometimes, it's not pretty. Those horses need time physically or mentally, and it can really cost a good part of your three-year-old year if you swing and miss."

Preakness Stakes

Early Voting made his next start on May 21 in the Preakness Stakes, the second leg of the American Triple Crown. With the Kentucky Derby winner Rich Strike bypassing the race, Early Voting went off as the third favorite in a nine that included Epicenter (Louisiana Derby, 2nd in the Kentucky Derby) and Secret Oath (Kentucky Oaks). He rated a couple of lengths off the early pace set by Armagnac, then took the lead near the head of the stretch. He drifted towards the middle of the track while opening a  length lead in mid-stretch, then shifted back to the rail while holding off Epicenter. The final margin was  lengths in a time of 1:54.54. Ortiz said the race had gone to plan. "On the back side, it just felt like we had been drilling in the morning," Ortiz said. "We had been working him just next to a horse, and he was very relaxed. I was very confident passing the 5/8 pole. I knew I was in a good spot. I took a peek back. Nobody was there. I knew my horse was ready."

Early Voting won the event on his owner's 65th birthday. Brown commented, "To win this race on Seth's birthday in Baltimore where he grew up and to be able to deliver a gift like that is hard to explain. When you can deliver a classic win, it makes the job worthwhile."  

Brown indicated that they will bypass the 2022 Belmont Stakes to give Early Voting time to recover. His next target will be the Travers Stakes later in the summer.

At Saratoga
Early Voting was given a layoff, then returned to racing on July 30 in the Jim Dandy Stakes at Saratoga. The field of four were all stakes winners including Epicenter, Zandon and Tawny Port. Early Voting went to the early lead over Zandon along the rail came under coaxing nearing the quarter pole and spun just off the inside into upper stretch loosely between foes, dug in under a drive under threat from a trio and was collared at the eighth pole, then weakened in the late stage and finished last.

The Travers Stakes on August 27 attracted a very strong field, including the top three finishers in the Kentucky Derby (Rich Strike, Epicenter and Zandon), Preakness winner Early Voting and Cyberknife, who had won the Haskell in his last start. Early Voting went four wide on the first turn, tracked the pace on the outside, dropped back four wide around the far turn and faltered then was eased but walked off.

Statistics

Notes:

An (*) asterisk after the odds means Early Voting was the post-time favourite.

Stud career
On October 5, 2022, Coolmore's Ashford Stud announced that Early Voting had been retired from racing. He will stand at their farm in Versailles, Kentucky for a fee to be announced.

Pedigree

Early Voting is inbred 4s × 3d to Storm Cat, meaning Storm Cat appears in the fourth generation on the sire's side of the pedigree and in the third generation on the dam's side.

References 

American racehorses
Preakness Stakes winners
Thoroughbred family 9-b
Racehorses trained in the United States
2019 racehorse births
Racehorses bred in Kentucky